Larry Sherman (died April 8, 2020) was an American record publisher who helped the rise of house music in the United States. A Chicago businessman, he owned Precision Record Pressing and founded multiple record labels, most notably Trax Records. He was 70 years old.

Labels
Hiphouzzz Records
Housetime Records
Trax Records
Precision Records
Lost Records
Maad
No Labull Records
Saber Records
Zig-Zig
Zoneaphone Records
Macadjous
Demand Records
R & R Record Review
Record Review

References

2020 deaths
Year of birth missing
Place of birth missing
Place of death missing
American music publishers (people)
Businesspeople from Chicago
American company founders